Buchrain railway station is a railway station in the municipality of Ebikon, in the Swiss canton of Lucerne. It is an intermediate stop on the standard gauge Zug–Lucerne line of Swiss Federal Railways. The station takes its name from the nearby municipality of Buchrain.

Services 
The following services stop at Buchrain:

References

External links 
 
 

Railway stations in the canton of Lucerne
Swiss Federal Railways stations